Progressive Republican Party may refer to:

 Progressive Republican Party (Algeria)
 Progressive Republican Party (Brazil)
 Progressive Republican Party (Spain)
 Progressive Republican Party (Turkey)
 Progressive Republican Party (Venezuela)
 Progressive Republicans (France)

See also
 Progressive Party (disambiguation)